Chloroselas azurea, the azure gem, is a butterfly in the family Lycaenidae. It is found in central and eastern Kenya and north-eastern Tanzania. The habitat consists of dry savanna.

References

Butterflies described in 1900
Chloroselas
Butterflies of Africa
Taxa named by Arthur Gardiner Butler